Liopinus is a genus of longhorn beetles of the subfamily Lamiinae. It was described by Linsley and Chemsak in 1995.

Species
 Liopinus alpha (Say, 1827)
 Liopinus centralis (LeConte, 1884)
 Liopinus chemsaki (Lewis, 1977)
 Liopinus decorus (Fall, 1907)
 Liopinus imitans (Knull, 1936)
 Liopinus incognitus (Lewis, 1977)
 Liopinus mimeticus (Casey, 1891)
 Liopinus misellus (LeConte, 1852)
 Liopinus punctatus (Haldeman, 1847)
 Liopinus wiltii (Horn, 1880)

References

Acanthocinini